Thalamae or Thalamai may refer to:
Thalamae (Elis), a town of ancient Elis
Thalamae (Laconia), a town of ancient Laconia, containing an oracle